Salem–Leckrone Airport  is a public use airport located two nautical miles (4 km) northwest of the central business district of Salem, a city in Marion County, Illinois, United States. It is owned by the Salem Airport Authority. This airport is included in the National Plan of Integrated Airport Systems for 2011–2015, which categorized it as a general aviation facility.

The airport is named for Phillip Leckrone, a flying instructor from Salem who fought in the Royal Air Force Eagle Squadrons during World War II.

Facilities and aircraft 
Salem–Leckrone Airport covers an area of 364 acres (147 ha) at an elevation of 573 feet (175 m) above mean sea level. It has one runway designated 18/36 with an asphalt surface measuring 4,098 by 75 feet (1,249 x 23 m).

The airport has an FBO offering fuel as well as a lounge, restrooms, a courtesy car, and pilot supplies.

For the 12-month period ending March 31, 2020, the airport had 19,000 aircraft operations, an average of 52 per day: 95% general aviation and 5% air taxi. At that time there were 8 aircraft based at this airport, all single-engine airplanes.

References

External links 
 Aerial image as of April 1998 from USGS The National Map
 

Airports in Illinois
Buildings and structures in Marion County, Illinois